Ken Warby  (9 May 1939 – 20 February 2023) was an Australian motorboat racer, who at his death held the water speed record of , set on Blowering Dam on 8 October 1978.

As a child, Warby's hero was Donald Campbell, who died attempting to break the record in 1967.

The Spirit of Australia
Warby designed the hull of his record-breaking boat, Spirit of Australia, himself and built it in his backyard. He started the project as a Makita salesman who happened to team up with two Leading aircraftmen at RAAF Base Richmond in the early 1970s. Warby bought three military surplus Westinghouse jet engines at auction for only $265. It was not in working order, but Crandall and Cox refurbished it. The Spirit was covered with a canvas tarpaulin when it rained and was made of wood and fibreglass.

With a subsequent  run on 8 October 1978, he set the record that still stands today.

In doing so, he became the first and only person to exceed 300 mph (482.8 km/h) on water and survive. Donald Campbell died on his attempt after his hydroplane crashed at over 320 mph (515 km/h) on his return run in his 1967 record attempt.

Later boats and retirement
By 2003, Warby had designed and built another boat, the Aussie Spirit, with which he planned to increase his own record. Of similar dimensions to Spirit of Australia, it was also powered by a Westinghouse J34 jet engine. The rudder alone on this new boat cost more than the $10,000 all-up cost of the original Spirit. Again, Warby designed, built, self-financed and piloted his own boat. Rule changes meant that a record attempt was never made with it.

Warby retired from record-breaking attempts in 2007. He has been working with his son David on a new boat to break the record. , they were still planning the record attempt.

Personal life and death 
Warby was born in Newcastle, NSW and lived in Australia before moving to Cincinnati, Ohio from 1983 where he died on 20 February 2023 aged 83.

References

External links 
  
 "Warby Motor Sports Web site". Retrieved 2013-08-08/

1939 births
2023 deaths
Water speed records
Australian motorboat racers
20th-century Australian inventors
Sport Australia Hall of Fame inductees
Australian Members of the Order of the British Empire